White Guard or White Guards may refer to:

 Anti-Communist Volunteer Militia (Italy), in Slovene Bela Garda or Belogardisti
 White Guard, the military arm of the Russian White movement
 The White Guard, a 1925 novel by Mikhail Bulgakov about the Russian White movement 
 White Guard (Finland), part of the White Army during the 1918 Finnish Civil War
 The White Guard (TV series), a Russian TV series based on the novel by Bulgakov
 White Guards, a name applied to the Slovene Home Guard

See also
White Guardian, a fictional character in Doctor Who